Acacia chinchillensis, commonly known as the chinchilla wattle, is a species of Acacia native to eastern Australia.

Description
It has smooth grey to green bark. It terete with inconspicuous ridges and soft white hair on branchlets. The leaves have a bipinnate shape with three to four pairs of pinnae each with 6 to 14 leaflets with a narrowly oblong shape. It produces golden
or yellow spherical flower heads.

Taxonomy
The species was first formally described by the botanist Mary Tindale in 1978 as part of the work Notes on Australian taxa of Acacia as published in the journal Telopea. It was reclassified as Racosperma chinchillense in 1987 by Leslie Pedley and transferred back into the genus Acacia in 2001.

Distribution
The species is native to an area of south west Queensland and found in the Darling Downs around the towns of Chinchilla, Tara, Cecil Plains and Karara. A population of around 100,000 individual trees were estimated to inhabit the surround state forests. The shrub is often part of the understorey in low woodland to open forest communities.

See also
 List of Acacia species

References

chinchillensis
Fabales of Australia
Flora of New South Wales
Flora of Queensland
Plants described in 1978